Mountain Moves is the fourteenth studio album by Deerhoof. It was released on September 8, 2017 through Joyful Noise.

Production and release
Deerhoof announced Mountain Moves in June 2017. The album was produced by Deerhoof along with the Children of Hoof Radio and Television Orchestra. Although the album was set for a September 8 release, the band made the album available on Bandcamp on August 28, with all the proceeds from purchases (before the official release) going to the Emergent Fund.

Track listing

Charts

References

2017 albums
Deerhoof albums
Joyful Noise Recordings albums